Pleurotomella anceyi is a species of sea snail, a marine gastropod mollusk in the family Raphitomidae.

Description
The shell attains a length of 7.4 mm, its diameter 3.4 mm.

Distribution
This marine species was found off the Azores at a depth of 1360 m.

References

 Gofas, S.; Le Renard, J.; Bouchet, P. (2001). Mollusca. in: Costello, M.J. et al. (eds), European Register of Marine Species: a check-list of the marine species in Europe and a bibliography of guides to their identification. Patrimoines Naturels. 50: 180-213.

External links
 Dautzenberg P. & Fischer H. (1897). Dragages effectués par l'Hirondelle et par la Princesse Alice 1888-1896. Mémoires de la Société Zoologique de France. 139-234; pl. 3-7
 

anceyi
Gastropods described in 1897